Alice Mazzuco Portugal (born May 16, 1959) is a Brazilian biochemical pharmacist and politician.

Born in Salvador, she was active in the student movement and technical workers' unions at the Federal University of Bahia, where she graduated in pharmacy-biochemistry in 1981. Portugal is affiliated to the Communist Party of Brazil since 1979; she was elected state representative of Bahia from 1995 to 2003, when she was elected to the  federal Chamber of Deputies, having been reelected in 2006, 2010 and 2014.

Political career
In April 2017 she voted against the labor reform. In August of the same year, she voted for a corruption investigation of the then President Michel Temer.

References

External links 
 Official page

Communist Party of Brazil politicians
Members of the Chamber of Deputies (Brazil) from Bahia
Brazilian communists
Federal University of Bahia alumni
1959 births
Living people
People from Salvador, Bahia